Herbert Vanderhoof was editor of Canada West magazine, and an early promoter of development in Canada's north.

He was a founding board member of the Northern Transportation Company.  In that capacity he and company President J.K. Cornwall invited Scientists and Journalists to be their guests on the Northland Suns first voyage of the season.

Carla Funk, born in the city of Vanderhoof, British Columbia, said the welcome sign of the city he founded described Vanderhoof as a "Chicago newspaperman".  She wrote his intention was to found a community of artists.

He founded Vanderhoof and Company, an advertising company, back in Chicago, in 1916.

References

Year of birth missing
1921 deaths
Railway executives
American publishing chief executives